Buchino Rocks (ska-'li 'bu-chi-no) is a group of rocks off the north coast of Greenwich Island in the South Shetland Islands, Antarctica situated  northwest of Stoker Island,  southeast of Romeo Island and  north-northwest of Tvarditsa Rocks.

The rocks are named after the settlements of Buchino, and Golemo (Great) Buchino and Malo (Little) Buchino in western Bulgaria.

Location
Bulgarian mapping in 2009.

See also 
 Composite Antarctic Gazetteer
 List of Antarctic islands south of 60° S
 SCAR
 Territorial claims in Antarctica

Maps
L.L. Ivanov. Antarctica: Livingston Island and Greenwich, Robert, Snow and Smith Islands. Scale 1:120000 topographic map.  Troyan: Manfred Wörner Foundation, 2009.

Notes

References
 Buchino Rocks. SCAR Composite Gazetteer of Antarctica.
 Bulgarian Antarctic Gazetteer. Antarctic Place-names Commission. (details in Bulgarian, basic data in English)

External links
 Buchino Rocks. Copernix satellite image

Rock formations of Greenwich Island
Bulgaria and the Antarctic